Bongrain Point is a headland which forms the south side of the entrance to Dalgliesh Bay on the west side of Pourquoi Pas Island, off the west coast of Graham Land. It was surveyed in 1936 by the British Graham Land Expedition under John Rymill, and re-surveyed in 1948 by the Falkland Islands Dependencies Survey, who named the point for Maurice Bongrain, surveyor and First Officer of the Pourquoi Pas, the ship of the French Antarctic Expedition, 1908–10, who was responsible for the first surveys of the area.

References
 

Headlands of Graham Land
Fallières Coast